Pogonomys is a genus of rodent in the family Muridae, found in New Guinea and the D'Entrecasteaux Islands, with one species (the Prehensile-tailed Rat) being found also in Australia.

Species include:

 Champion's tree mouse (Pogonomys championi)
 D'Entrecasteaux Archipelago pogonomys (Pogonomys fergussoniensis)
 Large tree mouse (Pogonomys loriae)
 Chestnut tree mouse (Pogonomys macrourus)
 Prehensile-tailed rat (Pogonomys mollipilosus)
 Gray-bellied tree mouse (Pogonomys sylvestris)

References

 
Rodent genera
Mammals of Papua New Guinea
Taxa named by Henri Milne-Edwards
Taxonomy articles created by Polbot
Rodents of New Guinea